Type C2 submarine may refer to:

 I-46-class submarine, also called Type C2 submarine or Type C submarine Late production model (Junsen Hei-gata Kōki-gata), the 1st class submarine of the Imperial Japanese Navy
 , also called Type C2 submarine (C2-gata), the 3rd class submarine of the Imperial Japanese Navy

See also
 C-class submarine (disambiguation)